Huacullani (from Aymara Waqullani) is one of seven districts of the Chucuito Province in the Puno Region in southern Peru.

Geography 
Other mountains are listed below:

Ethnic groups 
The people in the district are mainly indigenous citizens of Aymara descent. Aymara is the language which the majority of the population (92.62%) learnt to speak in childhood, 6.60% of the residents started speaking using the Spanish language (2007 Peru Census).

Authorities

Mayors 
 2011-2014: Braulio Morales Choquecahua.
 2007-2010: Jaime Musaja Chipana.

See also 
 Administrative divisions of Peru

References

External links 
 INEI Peru